Acid erosion is a type of tooth wear. It is defined as the irreversible loss of tooth structure due to chemical dissolution by acids not of bacterial origin. Dental erosion is the most common chronic condition of children ages 5–17, although it is only relatively recently that it has been recognised as a dental health problem. There is generally widespread ignorance of the damaging effects of acid erosion; this is particularly the case with erosion due to consumption of fruit juices because they tend to be considered as healthy. Acid erosion begins initially in the enamel, causing it to become thin, and can progress into dentin, giving the tooth a dull yellow appearance and leading to dentin hypersensitivity.

The most common cause of erosion is by acidic foods and drinks. In general, foods and drinks with a pH below 5.0–5.7 have been known to trigger dental erosion effects. Numerous clinical and laboratory reports link erosion to excessive consumption of such drinks. Those thought to pose a risk are soft drinks, some alcohol and fruit drinks, fruit juices such as orange juice (which contain citric acid) and carbonated drinks such as colas (in which the carbonic acid is not the cause of erosion, but citric and phosphoric acid). Additionally, wine has been shown to erode teeth, with the pH of wine as low as 3.0–3.8. Other possible sources of erosive acids are from exposure to poorly regulated chlorinated swimming pool water, and regurgitation of gastric acids. In children with chronic diseases, the use of medicines with acid components is a risk factor too. Dental erosion has also been recorded in the fossil record and was likely caused by the consumption of acidic fruits or plants.

Causes

Extrinsic acidic sources
Extrinsic acid erosion is when the source of acid originates from outside of the body. Acidic food and drink lowers the pH level of the mouth resulting in demineralisation of the teeth. A variety of drinks contribute to dental erosion due to their low pH level. Examples include fruit juices, such as apple and orange juices, sports drinks, wine and beer. Carbonated drinks, such as colas and lemonades, are also very acidic and hence have significant erosive potential. Foods such as fresh fruits, ketchup and pickled food in vinegar have been implicated in causing acid erosion. Frequency rather than total intake of acidic juices is seen as the greater factor in dental erosion; infants using feeding bottles containing fruit juices (especially when used as a comforter) are therefore at greater risk of acid erosion.

Saliva acts as a buffer, regulating the pH when acidic drinks are ingested. Drinks vary in their resistance to the buffering effect of saliva. Studies show that fruit juices are the most resistant to saliva's buffering effect, followed by, in order: fruit-based carbonated drinks and flavoured mineral waters, non-fruit-based carbonated drinks, sparkling mineral waters; mineral water being the least resistant. Because of this, fruit juices in particular, may prolong the drop in pH levels.

A number of medications such as chewable vitamin C, aspirin and some iron preparations are acidic and may contribute towards acid erosion. Certain drugs can cause hyposalivation (low quantity or quality of saliva) which is considered a risk factor for acid erosion.

Intrinsic acidic sources

Intrinsic dental erosion, also known as perimolysis, is the process whereby gastric acid from the stomach comes into contact with the teeth. This is often secondary to conditions such as anorexia nervosa, bulimia nervosa, gastroesophageal reflux disease (GERD) and rumination syndrome. Dental erosion can also occur by non-extrinsic factors. There is evidence linking eating disorders with a range of oral health problems including dental erosion, caries and xerostomia. Reduced salivary flow rate, a common symptom of bulimia, predisposes an individual to dental erosion due to increased vulnerability to the effects of acidic food and drinks. Self-induced vomiting increases the risk of dental erosion by a factor of 5.5 compared to healthy controls. Lesions are most commonly found on the palatal surfaces of the teeth, followed by the occlusal and then the buccal surfaces. The main cause of GERD is increased acid production by the stomach. This is not exclusive to adults, as GERD and other gastrointestinal disorders may cause dental erosions in children.

Behaviour
Acid erosion often coexists with abrasion and attrition. Abrasion is most often caused by brushing teeth too hard.
Any frothing or swishing acidic drinks around the mouth before swallowing increases the risk of widespread acid erosion. Sucking citrus fruits can also contribute to acid erosion.

Diagnosis
In-vivo studies are advantageous in assessing erosion directly from the patient's mouth. There are numerous signs of dental erosion, including changes in appearance and sensitivity.

Colour 
One of the physical changes can be the colour of teeth. Dental erosion can lead to two major tooth colour change – the first being a change of colour that usually happens on the cutting edge of the central incisors. This causes the cutting edge of the tooth to become transparent. A second sign is a yellowish tint on the eroded tooth. This occurs because the white enamel has eroded away to reveal the yellowish dentin beneath.  On top of clinical examination, the dentist may take intra-oral photographs to monitor the extent and progress of erosion. Clinical photographs lead to comparable results to a visual examination, however both may result in an underestimation of the extent of tooth wear.

Shape 

A change in shape of the teeth is also a sign of dental erosion. Teeth will begin to appear with a broad rounded concavity, and the gaps between teeth will become larger. There can be evidence of wear on surfaces of teeth not expected to be in contact with one another. If dental erosion occurs in children, a loss of enamel surface characteristics can occur. Amalgam restorations in the mouth may be clean and non-tarnished. As tooth substance around restorations erodes away, fillings may also appear to be rising out of the tooth. The teeth may form divots on the chewing surfaces when dental erosion is occurring. This mainly happens on the first, second, and third molars. To monitor the change in shape over time, dentists can create and retain accurate, serial study casts. Dentists may also employ dental indices to guide their diagnosis and management of the condition. A scoring system referred to as Basic Erosive Wear Examination (BEWE) grades the appearance or severity of wear on the teeth by the extent of hard tissue loss. It is noted that indices are useful in monitoring the most severe clinical changes in tooth wear. However, they lack comprehensiveness as they cannot measure the rate of progression and cannot monitor all teeth affected by erosion. There is also a lack of an index which is universally accepted and standardised.

One of the most severe signs of dental erosion is cracking, where teeth begin to crack off and become coarse. Other signs include pain when eating hot, cold, or sweet foods. This pain is due to the enamel having been eroded away, exposing the sensitive dentin.

Optical properties 
Based on the optical changes induced in eroded tissue by the lesions, in 2015 Koshoji et al. also demonstrated in a novel method that by using laser speckle images (LSI) it is possible to acquire information on the microstructure of the enamel and detect minimal changes, such as early non-carious lesions. No clinical data has been published to demonstrate the effectiveness of this technique in vivo.

Prevention and management
The causes of dental erosion are classified into two main categories – intrinsic and extrinsic. The former is due to regurgitated gastric acid from the stomach while the latter is from dietary, medicinal, occupational & recreational origins. It is important to recognise it early, detect its cause and provide relevant advice or treatment to stop its progression. Strategies for prevention and management consist of the following:

Where intrinsic sources of acid have been identified:

A: Individuals

 Consult a medical doctor immediately if you notice or are aware of any signs and symptoms of gastroesophageal reflux disease (GERD), such as acid reflux and heartburn, or if you suffer from an eating disorder or chronic alcoholism. They can confirm the diagnosis and develop a treatment plan accordingly.
 Be cautious when purchasing the following items: vitamin C, iron-tonic and amino-acid tablets, aspirin, hydrogen chloride-based preparations, asthma medications, mouthrinses with low pH, paediatric syrup medication, acidic salivary substitutes and bleaching agents. They can potentially lead to erosion.

B: Dental professionals

 Prescribe or administer a neutralising agent, such as antacid tablets in suspension. Antacids helps neutralise stomach acidity and inhibit proteolytic activity of pepsin, both of which provide relief to symptoms of GERD such as heartburn. Note that antacids may interfere with other medications and are not suitable for women who are pregnant or breastfeeding, those that suffer from liver disease, kidney disease or heart failure and an illness associated with sodium control, such as high blood pressure or cirrhosis.
 Encourage patients to maintain their body mass index (BMI) within normal range or by making healthy lifestyle changes in relation to diet and exercise. Obesity is said to be an important risk factor in the development and deterioration of GERD.
 Find out if the patient has any underlying medical conditions or did consider a change of medications that induce hyposalivation and vomiting. If the patient displays severe signs or symptoms, referral to a medical doctor is necessary. Refer patients to a dietician for them to receive personalised dietary counselling if signs and symptoms still persist.
 Request that patients complete the SCOFF questionnaire, a valid and reliable screening tool for early detection and treatment of suspected eating disorders. A response of ‘yes’ receives 1 point. An accumulative score of > 2 indicates the likelihood of anorexia or bulimia. The acronym SCOFF dictates the following questions:

 Do you make yourself SICK because you feel uncomfortably full?
 Do you worry you have lost CONTROL over how much you eat?
 Have you recently lost more than ONE stone in a 3-month period?
 Do you believe yourself to be FAT when others say you are too thin?
 Would you say that FOOD dominates your life?

C: Industry

 Develop effective over-the-counter medications for gastroesophageal reflux disease (GERD) that minimise side effects of those presently available. For instance, some side effects antacids, H2 blockers and proton pump inhibitors have in common are constipation, diarrhea and nausea.

Where Extrinsic sources of acids have been identified

A: Individuals

 Reduce the frequency of acidic food intake, particularly carbonated (fizzy) drinks and fruit juices that contain phosphoric or citric acid. Tooth enamel and dentine are both made up of calcium deficient carbonated hydroxyapatite. Acid and/or chelators present in the food humans consume penetrate through the dental plague, the pellicle and the protein/ lipid coating into the individual crystals. Hydrogen ions combine with carbonate and/ or phosphate, releasing all ions in the affected region, giving rise to direct surface etching/ erosion. Reducing the frequency of intake, minimises the duration to which enamel is exposed to acids, making it less susceptible to acid attack and allows the eroded tooth surface to remineralise. Ideally, confine these items exclusively to mealtime.
 Consume food items enriched with calcium or stimulates the flow of saliva. For instance, dairy products such as milk & cheese. Saliva acts as a buffer which resists abrupt changes in pH in the mouth and keeps it neutral. Moreover, it aids the precipitation of calcium phosphate under specific pH conditions and bathes the tooth surface in fluoride, both of which promote remineralisation.
 Drink through a straw to reduce localised contact between erosive fluids and the teeth. Similarly, drinks should not be held in the mouth or sipped for a long period of time. Otherwise, rinse your mouth thoroughly with water or chew sugar-free gum immediately after as it removes residual food debris and lowers the pH of saliva. The result of salivary flow rate and salivary pH from chewing gum for 20 minutes is significantly greater than resting flow rate.
 Avoid abrasive forces by brushing gently using a soft bristled hand toothbrush. In-vitro research has shown that there is a higher potential for abrasion on erosive enamel & dentine with an electric toothbrush as compared to a manual toothbrush. Furthermore, delay brushing of teeth until approximately an hour after an acidic meal to prevent the removal of softened tooth substance.
 Use products that promote remineralisation such as fluoride-containing mouthrinses and toothpastes. Fluoride-containing products promote repair of acid damaged tooth surfaces and block exposed dentine tubules, reducing dentine permeability and preventing hypersensitivity. When used before contact with acid, fluoride-containing products also help inhibit acid erosion. Stannous fluoride (SnF2)-containing toothpastes in particular have been shown to increase resistance to acid erosion compared to other fluoride-containing toothpastes.

B: Dental professionals

 To facilitate detection and diagnosis, dental professionals should be aware of the appearance of tooth erosion – short, cupped, saucer-shaped with a glassy, shiny surface and loss of surface architecture. Several teeth are affected at the same time, with the most commonly affected area being the tongue surfaces of the upper front teeth.
 Recording index. Use the Basic Erosive Wear Examination (BEWE), an objective four-level scoring system to determine the severity of erosion in each sextant. The cumulative score corresponds to its level of risk and acts as a guide for appropriate management. The distribution of BEWE scores is said to be more accurate than that of Tooth wear index (TWI) scores.
 0 = no erosive tooth wear
 1 = initial loss of surface texture
 2 = distinct defect, hard tissue loss < 50% of surface area
 3 = hard tissue loss ≥ 50% of surface area

 Minimal intervention & prevention of dental erosion. The first line treatment after detection of acid erosion is remineralisation and prevention. Remineralisation is the reparative process of demineralised tooth substance. It is commonly promoted by applying fluoride-containing substances onto the surfaces of affected teeth, though is limited by bioavailable calcium. The following are some methods of remineralisation: professionally-applied fluoride varnish, home-applied fluoride gel and toothpaste with stannous fluoride (SnF2) formulation. Prevention of erosion is largely through discussions regarding avoidance/management of extrinsic and intrinsic sources of acid, and recommendation of suitable at-home preventive oral hygiene habits. Correct tooth brushing technique (timing, bristle stiffness, brushing force & toothpaste) should be discussed. Toothpastes containing stabilized stannous fluoride have higher anti-erosive properties when compared to conventional sodium fluoride or sodium monofluorophosphate formulations. Where possible, a stabilized stannous fluoride-containing toothpaste should be recommended.
 Restoration is the process of building back lost tooth structure to restore their function, integrity and morphology. The type of restorative treatment depends on the degree of damage that has been done:

 Small area of erosion along the biting surfaces of tooth can be restored using detection of acid erosion is resin composite filling. This is a tooth-coloured filling material commonly used to restore decayed teeth.
 Moderate degree of damage at upper from teeth can be restored using detection of acid erosion is ceramic or resin composite veneers. A veneer is a thin piece of tooth-coloured, custom-made shells that cover the front side of teeth.
 Large extent of damage, involving two or more surfaces of tooth can be restored using ceramic crowns or overlays. Crowns are tooth-shaped capsplaced over the damaged tooth to restore its shape; Overlays are pre-built fillings that are used to rebuild the pointed parts of back teeth (known as cusps).

However, long-term treatment success is only possible when the causes of acid erosion are eradicated. Otherwise, the erosive process will continue to destroy tooth substance. To achieve best outcomes, combining active treatment with preventive measures and recall at regular periods is needed.

C: Industry

 Avoid having environments where there is repeated exposure and inhalation of acidic particles in occupational areas when possible as several case reports have proven a link between this and the prevalence of dental erosion. Alternatively, subsidise regular dental services for those with higher risk of developing the condition. For instance, professional wine tasters, competitive swimmers and industrial workers working in factories that involve batteries, galvanizing or ammunition.
 Educate workers on potential occupational hazards and promote maintenance of good oral health. For instance, standardise behaviours such as wearing personal protective equipment for the eyes and face and gargling during or after working.
 Alter pH or chelation properties of acidic soft drinks, particularly those with citric or phosphoric acid by reducing its composition. Tooth enamel is composed of calcium-deficient carbonated hydroxyapatite. Chelating agents like hydrogen or citrate ions combine with calcium, carbonate or phosphate ions in the region, thereby causing direct surface etching and tissue loss.

See also 

Tooth wear
Abrasion
Abfraction
Attrition
Bruxism
Stephan curve

References

External links 

 Saliva and Tooth Dissolution

Acquired tooth pathology